Southwell is a minster and market town in the district of Newark and Sherwood in Nottinghamshire, England. It is home to the grade-I listed Southwell Minster, the cathedral of the Anglican Diocese of Southwell and Nottingham. The population of the town was recorded at 7,558 in the 2021 Census.

Toponymy
The origin of the name is unclear. Several sites claim to be the original "well", notably at GR  where a plaque has been placed; in the Admiral Rodney pub; on the south side of the Minster, known as Lady Well in the 19th century; and one by the cloisters called Holy Well.

Early history
The remains of an opulent Roman villa were excavated beneath the Minster and its churchyard in 1959. Part of a mural from the excavation is displayed in the Minster. It is one of three of its type found in the territories of the Corieltauvi (or Coritani) tribes – along with Scampton in Lincolnshire and Norfolk Street in Leicestershire. A stretch of the Fosse Way runs on the far bank of the River Trent, with evidence of Roman settlement at Ad Pontem ("to the bridge" or "at the bridge"), north-west of the village of East Stoke. There is no clear evidence of a road between Ad Pontem and Southwell. Other evidence of Roman settlement includes the use of Roman bricks in prebendary buildings around the Minster, remains of a ditch or fosse discovered at Burgage Hill in the 19th century, and possibly Roman remains beneath the Church Street site of the recently vacated Minster School.

The Venerable Bede records a multiple baptism in the "flood of the Trent" near "Tiovulginacester" by Paulinus in the presence of Edwin of Northumbria, whom he had converted to Christianity in 627. There is disagreement on the location of Tiovulginacester, but Paulinus certainly visited it and may have founded the first church in Southwell.

Remains of Eadburh, Abbess of Repton and daughter of Ealdwulf of East Anglia were buried in Southwell's Saxon church. Eadburh was appointed Abbess under the patronage of King Wulfhere of Mercia. She appears in the Life of Guthlac and is thought to have died about AD 700. Her remains were buried or translated to Southwell Minster, and revered there in the Middle Ages. The only reference is in a Pilgrims Guide to Shrines and Burial Places of the Saints of England supposedly written in 1000: "There resteth St. Eadburh in the Minster of Southwell near the water called the Trent."

Eadwy of England gave land in Southwell to Oskytel, Archbishop of York, in 956, this charter being the first dated reference to Southwell. In 1051 Archbishop Ælfric Puttoc died at Southwell, which indicates that the archiepiscopal residence and church might have been established by then. A tessellated floor and the 11th-century tympanum over a doorway in the north transept are evidence of construction of the Minster after this time. The Domesday Book (1086) gives detail of an archiepiscopal manor in Southwell.

A custom known as the "Gate to Southwell" originated after 1109, when the Archbishop of York, Thomas I, wrote to each Nottinghamshire parish for contributions to building of a new mother church. Annually at Whitsuntide, the resulting "Southwell Pence" were taken to the Minster in a procession from Nottingham, headed by the Mayor and followed by clergy and lay people bound for Southwell's Whitsun Fair. The Pence were paid at the Minster's north porch to the Chapter Clerk. The "gate" in the name of Southwell Gate means "street", as in many East Midland and North-Eastern street names. The custom in its original form persisted well into the 16th century. It was revived in 1981 by the Dolphin Morrismen, but imposition of traffic-management costs forced the organisers to abandon it in 2014. It is survived by the Gate to Southwell Festival, a broad musical event held every early June since 2007 on a site near Southwell and at various venues in the town.

Geoffrey Plantagenet was ordained a priest at Southwell in 1189. On 4 April 1194, Richard I and the King of Scots, William I, were in Southwell, having spent Palm Sunday in Clipstone. King John visited Southwell between 1207 and 1213, ostensibly to hunt in Sherwood Forest, but also on the way to expedition to Wales in 1212.

1300–1800
The Saracen's Head was built in 1463 on land gifted in 1396 by Archbishop Thomas Arundel of York to John and Margaret Fysher. When built, the first floor overhung the roadway in the style of the time.

In 1603, James VI of Scotland passed through Southwell on his way to London to be crowned King James I.

In the English Civil War, King Charles I spent his last night as a free man in May 1646 in the Saracen's Head (then the King's Head), before surrendering to the Scottish Army stationed at nearby Kelham. The town, the Minster and the Archbishop's Palace suffered under Oliver Cromwell's troops, as they sequestered the palace to stable their horses, broke monuments, and ransacked graves for lead and other valuables. In 1793, there were still iron rings in the walls to secure the horses. By end of the war the Archbishop's Palace was in ruins apart from its Great Hall. It is reputed that Cromwell also stayed at the King's Head.

A Bridewell built on the Burgage in 1656 was enlarged in 1787 to become a county prison. There is evidence that a house of correction was built in 1611, so that the Bridewell may itself have been an enlargement. Mary Ann Brailsford of apple fame (see below) was baptised at Southwell in May 1791, and Matthew Bramley in 1796 in Balderton.

19th century and later
By 1801 the population was 2,305. In 1803, Lord Byron stayed with his mother in Burgage Manor during holidays from Harrow and Cambridge. His mother rented the house. By that time he had become 6th Baron Byron of Rochdale, but the family home, Newstead Abbey, still required repairs, which they could not afford.
The town was late in getting a permanent theatre. This was in the yard of the former Cross Keys. In 1816 two large rooms on the first floor of premises of James Adams, a whitesmith were converted for use as a theatre. The first company to use it was that if Joseph Smedley.

Southwell today
The town has many historical buildings including the prebendal houses in Church Street and Westgate and the Methodist church, which has a right of way beneath it, so that the upper floor seats more than the lower. The workhouse (1824) was a prototype for many others. Owned by the National Trust, it shows its appearance in the 19th century. Behind the Minster is a partly ruined palace, once a residence of the Archbishop of York. It includes the recently restored State Chamber, Cardinal Wolsey's former dining room, and gardens among the ruins.

As the site of an Anglican cathedral, the town is sometimes taken as a city and was treated as such in the 1911 Encyclopædia Britannica. However, its city status is not recognised by the government. Southwell has an active Town Council.

The town is something of an oddity in North Nottinghamshire, being visibly affluent compared with neighbouring Newark-on-Trent and Mansfield. Agriculture and coal have seen the fortunes of the other two fluctuate over the years, while Southwell has remained a place where wealthier Nottinghamians like to reside. It appeared in the Sunday Times shortlist of Best Places to Live 2017 for the Midlands region.

In most of Nottinghamshire, Southwell is pronounced SUH-thull, with a voiced "th" and a silent "w". Southwell's own residents tend to pronounce it as it is spelt.

The town's two infant schools (aged 3–5) are Southwell Holy Trinity C of E and Lowes Wong . The latter also teaches children aged 7–11. The local secondary school is Southwell Minster School, which also educates the choristers of the Minster and gifted musicians in its Junior Department. It has particularly good GCSE and AS/A level results for Nottinghamshire.

The Bramley cooking apple was first seeded in Southwell, by Mary Ann Brailsford in 1809. Henry Merryweather, a local nurseryman then 17 years old, saw potential and cultivated it from cuttings. The apple is widely used and renowned for its acidic taste and for cooking into a smooth purée. One local football club, Southwell City, is nicknamed "The Bramleys" and the town's library is called the Bramley Centre. In March 2009, a stained-glass window was placed in Southwell Minister to mark the apple's bicentenary.

The local community newspaper is The Bramley, of which some 11,200 copies a month are delivered free in and around Southwell.

Sports clubs include Southwell Rugby Club (known as the Redmen), formed in 1922–1923. In the 2011–2012 season, it won a historic treble as RFU Midlands 4 (East) North League Champions, Nottinghamshire Junior Cup winners and Nottinghamshire/Lincolnshire/Derbyshire Plate winners. There is also a Southwell Cricket Club. Southwell City Football Club, an FA Charter Standard Community Club, involves over 400 local players in 35 teams aged five years to veteran.

Southwell has a leisure centre run by a local trust, with trustees from the community, although the district council also provides limited support.

The annual Southwell Music Festival is held every August in Southwell Minster and other nearby venues. The Gate to Southwell Festival of roots and acoustic music is held each year in early June.

Southwell Racecourse, owned by the Arena Racing Company, is situated on the outskirts of the town near Fiskerton and has an all-weather track. It hosts jump and flat racing.

The town is linked to Newark and Nottingham by the A612, although this has now been downgraded to a C road, and to north Nottingham and villages to the west by B6386. The railway station at the nearby village of Fiskerton has gained a small car park in recent years to cater for Southwell commuters. Southwell is also served by Nottingham City Transport's rural Pathfinder 26 service to Nottingham and Stagecoach East Midlands (Mansfield) service to Mansfield and Newark. There are other infrequent services to nearby villages.

The town is twinned with Sées in France, Sarzana in Italy, and Český Brod in the Czech Republic.

Governance
The Town Council, since the 2019 elections, consists of eight Liberal Democrat councillors, four Conservatives and two Independents. The Council Chair was held in 2019–2021 by Mrs Lyn Harris (Lib. Dem.) and since then by Sally Reynolds (Independent). The Chair of the Town Environment Committee is Peter Harris, that of the Governance and Finance Committee Martin Stott and that of the Planning Committee Peter Scorer (all three Lib. Dem.) The town and surrounding villages and hamlets are represented as District Councillors by Malcolm Brock (Lib. Dem.), Peter Harris (Lib. Dem.) and Penny Rainbow (Con.)

Communities

Town districts 
The historic town centre is based around the cathedral area, but nearby outlying communities grew and eventually were subsumed into the town.

 The Prebendage was the heart of Southwell centred on the Minster and the surrounding prebendary properties
 Burgage was north of the cathedral, around Burgage Green, traditionally hosting burgage properties
 Hightown was to the north-west along Westgate, along the main shopping street
 East Thorpe and West Thorpe were hamlets on either side of these areas, St Catherine's Well, at the extremity of West Thorpe, was formerly noted for treating rheumatism.

Localities 
Separated further afield from the core urban area, but within the parish are the following places:

 Normanton, a hamlet on the east side of the River Greet positioned around Corkhill Lane, it hosts a sizeable garden centre business
 Maythorne, an area based around a former silk mill north of the town, alongside the River Greet
 Brackenhurst, an agricultural campus for Nottingham Trent University, is to the south
 Brinkley is a hamlet to the south-east along Fiskerton Road.

Notable people
In order of birth:
St Edburga of Repton was translated from Repton Abbey to Southwell and died here about AD 700.
Ælfric Puttoc (died 1051), Archbishop of York, died here.
Geoffrey Plantagenet, natural son of King Henry II of England and Archbishop of York, was ordained priest here in 1181.
Matthew Sylvester (c. 1636–1708), Nonconformist minister and religious writer, was born here.
Thomas Spofforth (1743–1826), organist, died here.
John Spray (c. 1768–1827), tenor singer and vicar choral for the Dublin cathedrals, was born here and sang as a boy in the Minster Choir.
Reginald Spofforth (1769–1827), composer and organist, was baptised here.
Mary Ann Brailsford, who grew the first Bramley cooking apple tree from seed, was baptised here in May 1791.
Rev. John Thomas Becher (1770–1848), cleric, social reformer and friend of Lord Byron, was Vicar-General of Southwell Minster in 1818–1840.
Richard Ingleman (1777–1838), architect and surveyor, died here.
Henry Stenton (1815–1887) was a first-class cricketer and Southwell solicitor.
Francis Tinley (1819–1889), first-class cricketer with Nottinghamshire, was born here, as was his first-class cricketing brother Vincent Tinley (1828–1899).
Chappell Batchelor (1822–1884), organist and first-class cricketer, was born here and sang as a boy in the Minster Choir.
John Hatfield (1831–1889), first-class cricketer, was born here.
William Horsley (1835–1864), first-class cricketer, was born and died here.
Sebastian Smith (1869–1948), a stage and film actor, was born here.
Edmond Foljambe (1890–1960), first-class cricketer, was born here.
Ted Hufton (1892–1967), international footballer, was born here.
Sir Joseph Lockwood (1904–1991), whose company helped to finance The Beatles, was born here.
Lilian Greenwood (born 1966), Labour MP for Nottingham South, lived in Southwell 1999–2020.
Robert Edward Jenrick (born 1982), Conservative MP for Newark since 2014, rents a property here.
Scott Loach (born 1988), League footballer, attended Southwell Minster School and played for Southwell United as a youth.

Transport links

Bus services

Railway stations
Southwell was previously served by a branch line which ran from Rolleston Junction to Mansfield. There was a station on the line which served the town. It was opened in 1847, but closed to passengers in 1959 and to goods traffic in 1964. The station survives as a private residence. The trackbed towards Mansfield is now the Southwell Trail. The trackbed to Rolleston Junction is now covered by housing within the town and goes on to form a private access road from Southwell to Southwell Racecourse. Both stations offer a service between Matlock, Lincoln, Leicester, Newark-on-Trent, Derby and Nottingham.

Education
Secondary education in the town is predominantly provided by The Minster School, which still educates choristers of Southwell Minster. The Minster School is a Specialist College for Humanities and Music and was rated outstanding by Ofsted in 2011/2012. Pupils may also choose to attend school at Newark-on-Trent, which is about a 20-minute drive east. The School of Animal, Rural and Environmental Sciences is part of Nottingham Trent University. and offers further and higher education courses in agricultural-related subjects at its Brackenhurst campus just outside Southwell.

See also
Dumble – a local word used to refer to a small wooded area
Hockerwood – a historic deer park in the area
The Workhouse, Southwell – the former parish workhouse; a prototype for many round the country, and now a National Trust property

References

Further references
Betty M. Arundel, Southwell - A History Walk, The Southwell Civic Society, 2001
F. R. Barry, Period of my Life (Bishop of Southwell)", Hodder & Stoughton, 1970
R. M. Beaumont, A Flash of Lightning on Guy Fawkes Night, 1711: The Fire at Southwell Minster, The Thoroton Society, 1973
R. M. Beaumont, The Chapter of Southwell Minster, a Story of 1,000 years, 1956
M. Bishop, An Archaeological Resource Assessment of Roman Nottinghamshire, EMARF, n. d.
M. Boyes, Love without wings: The story of the unique relationship between Elizabeth Bridget Pigot of Southwell and the young poet, Lord Byron, J. M. Tatler & Son, 1988
J. Buckler, The Collegiate Church of Saint Mary, Southwell, Bermondsey, 1810
T. H. Clark, The History and Antiquities of Southwell Collegiate Church, J. Whittingham, 1838
Roger Dobson, Southwell Inns and Alehouses'', Nottinghamshire County Council, 2008

External links

Southwell Town Council

 
Towns in Nottinghamshire
Civil parishes in Nottinghamshire
Newark and Sherwood
Towns with cathedrals in the United Kingdom